Queen Anne's School is an independent boarding and day school for girls aged 11 to 18, situated in the suburb of Caversham just north of the River Thames and Reading town centre and occupying a  campus. There are around 450 pupils. Nearly half are boarders. Some stay seven nights a week; others stay during the working week (weekly boarders) or two, three or four nights a week (flexi boarders). Saturday morning lessons were replaced in 2009 by a programme of optional sport, hobbies and extended learning activities, including rowing, horse riding, textiles and first aid. The school awards scholarships in academic subjects, sport, music, art and drama at ages 11 and 13 and at sixth form entry.

Queen Anne's is a member of the Girls' Schools Association and the Boarding Schools' Association. Queen Anne's was chosen as one of Tatler magazine's Top 225 prep and public schools 2010.

History

In 1698 eight merchants founded the Grey Coat Hospital, a Christian foundation. In 1706 the foundation received a royal charter from Queen Anne. In 1874 Grey Coat Hospital became a girls' school. The Grey Coat Hospital Foundation used part of its endowment to buy a mansion in Henley Road in Caversham which became Queen Anne's School in 1894. The site was previously occupied by Amersham Hall School. The social history of the school is described in detail in a 2008 book by Daniel Talbot, former head of history, 'The Scarlet Runners: A Social History of Queen Anne's, Caversham'.

Facilities
Queen Anne's campus is a  site with landscaped gardens and playing fields immediately adjacent to the teaching and boarding accommodation. The facilities include a café for sixth formers and parents (opened 2009) and a Chapel, designed by Reginald Blomfield. In 2016, the school opened a new Sixth Form Centre.

The Main Block and Chapel at Queen Anne's School are Grade II listed buildings.

Sport
Lacrosse, tennis, swimming and netball are major sports at Queen Anne's and there is provision for most other sports either at the school or at local clubs. The school has produced Olympic and national-level sportswomen.

Music
The school's own groups include: Chamber Choir, Consort Choir, Saxoholics, Saxability, Orchestra, Chamber Orchestra, Wind Quartet, Flute Group, Swing Band and Junior Wind Band. The Chamber Choir, Saxoholics and Consort Choir have performed in New York, London and Rome.

Drama
The school puts on three full-scale productions a year, and organises masterclasses and workshops with professional practitioners.

Queen Anne's drama pupils have won places at the National Youth Theatre in London to train with professionals and places at RADA.

In 2007, a Queen Anne's student featured in the St Trinians film.

Debating and public speaking
Queen Anne's School was a founder of the World Individual Debating and Public Speaking Championships and its students participate in the competition every year. It has also hosted the event on a number of occasions, most recently in 2003.

Academic performance
The 2011 Ofsted Social Care report rated the school as 'outstanding', which Ofsted translates as "The main inspection finding is that this is an outstanding
boarding school. The outcomes for boarders as described in the Every Child Matters document and underpinned by the nationally agreed standards are excellent. The school has an exceptionally high commitment towards enabling girls to fulfil their potential."

The Independent Schools Inspectorate's Inspection Report 2011 said: "The pupils’ overall achievement is excellent. The school meets highly successfully its aim to enable pupils to go onto higher education, and develop their talents fully." and "The quality of the pupils’ personal development is excellent, ensuring that the school’s aim to enable them to become confident, well-balanced individuals is met with resounding success."

University destinations
Queen Anne's students go on to study at degree level at university, and go on to do postgraduate work. The courses they take range from art, drama and classics to medicine, civil and chemical engineering, material sciences, modern languages and management.

Notable former pupils

Lesley Abdela, human rights campaigner
Barbara Brooke, Baroness Brooke of Ystradfellte, politician
Olivia Carnegie-Brown, Olympic rower
Christine Chaundler, children's author
Janet Chisholm, MI6 agent during the Cold War
Helena Cobban, writer and researcher on international relations
Valerie Eliot, wife of poet T. S. Eliot
Cara Gascoigne, physical educator, coach
Fiona Hodgson, Baroness Hodgson of Abinger, politician
Joan Jackson (Joan Hunter Dunn), muse of Sir John Betjeman
Joanna Kennedy, civil engineer
Elizabeth Jane Lloyd, artist
Katharine Lloyd-Williams, anaesthetist
Brenda Rawnsley, arts activist
Jenny Seagrove, actress
Posy Simmonds, cartoonist, writer and illustrator
Hannah Steinberg, pioneer of experimental psychopharmacology
Tamara Taylor, captain of England women's Rugby 2015 Six Nations team
Nell Truman, tennis player, French Open doubles finalist
Faith Wainwright, President of the Institution of Structural Engineers
Lizbeth Webb, soprano and stage actress
Margaret Webster, theater actress and director

References

External links

Profile at the Good Schools Guide
Profile on the ISC website

Boarding schools in Berkshire
Private schools in Reading, Berkshire
Girls' schools in Berkshire
Educational institutions established in 1894
Grade II listed buildings in Reading
1894 establishments in England
Member schools of the Girls' Schools Association
Church of England private schools in the Diocese of Oxford
Schools with a royal charter